Zoë Beck (born 12 March 1975 as Henrike Heiland in Ehringshausen in the Lahn-Dill district) is a German writer, publisher, translator, dialogue book author and dubbing director. She has won multiple awards for her books and translations.

Life 
At the age of three she began to play the piano. Numerous performances and multiple awards at competitions followed. After graduating from high school she studied German and English literature in Giessen, Bonn and Durham as a scholarship holder of the German National Academic Foundation. She completed her studies with a master's thesis on the crime writer Elizabeth George. She then worked as an editor and TV producer for the Kirch Group. Since 2004 she has been working as a freelance author and lives in Berlin.

Beck first wrote screenplays, including the Christmas film "In der Weihnachtsbäckerei" (In the Christmas Bakery) with Rolf Zuckowski for ZDF children's television, various episodes of Tabaluga tivi, Nelly Net(t) and the German version of the sitcom Disney's Kurze Pause for the Disney Channel. Since 2006 she has been publishing mainly prose as a writer.

After surviving cancer in 2007 she changed her name to Zoë Beck.

Together with Jan Karsten Beck, she founded the literary publishing house CulturBooks in 2013. The publishing house emerged from the online feuilleton Culturmag.

In addition to her writing, Zoë Beck works as a literary translator and dubbing director for film and television (including Hackerville, Dietland, The Terror, The Mist, Fear the Walking Dead, Orange Is the New Black, Followers). From September 2013 to August 2014, she was the columnist for the SWR2 programme LiteraturEN, a radio column that is awarded to a different contemporary author each year, and subsequently wrote literary reviews for the station.

Zoë Beck acts as their German voice on reading tours of international authors, for example for Denise Mina, Val McDermid, Louise Welsh and Carl Nixon. She is on the board of directors of Litprom, a member of the PEN Centre Germany, co-founder of the feminist writers' network "Herland" and co-initiator of the action alliance #verlagegegenrechts. At the Leipzig Book Fair 2018 and 2019, she organised, among other things, the event series "Die Gedanken sind bunt". Beck has been a member of the jury for the Kurt Tucholsky Prize since 2018.

Awards 

 2010 Friedrich-Glauser-Preis
 2011 Friedrich-Glauser-Preis, Nomination
 2012 September, KrimiZEIT-Bestenliste
 2013 Goldene Leslie, Nomination
 2014 January, February, March, KrimiZEIT-Bestenliste
 2014 Radio-Bremen-Krimipreis
 2014 Virenschleuder-Preis, Marketingpreis der Frankfurter Buchmesse, Kategorie „Persönlichkeit“
 2014 25 Frauen für die digitale Zukunft
 2015 March, April, May, June KrimiZEIT-Bestenliste
 2015 Buchkultur: Die besten Krimis der Saison Top 10
 2016 Deutscher Krimi Preis, Category „National“, 3. Platz
 2017 July, August Krimibestenliste der FAS/Deutschlandfunk Kultur
 2017 Internationaler Literaturpreis des Haus der Kulturen der Welt und der Stiftung Elementarteilchen, Nomination
 2018 Goldene Auguste, Award for her services to women's crime literature
 2018 Wiesbadener Krimistipendium 2019
 2019 Kurd-Laßwitz-Preis for Best Translation to Science Fiction for Pippa Goldschmidt, "Von der Notwendigkeit, den Weltraum zu ordnen", nomination
2020 July, August, September Krimibestenliste of the FAS/Deutschlandfunk Kultur
2020 Krimifuchs of the City of Berlin (Berlin Crime Prize)
2020 German Crime Fiction Prize, "National" category, 1st place for Paradise City
2021 Friedrich-Glauser-Preis, category novel, nomination for Paradise City
2021 Political Crime Prize of the Heinrich Böll Foundation Baden-Württemberg 2021 for Paradise City
2021 Kurd-Laßwitz Prize for Best German-language science fiction novel, nomination
2021 Town Clerk in Tampere, Finland

Work

Novels (Name: Zoë Beck) 

 Wenn es dämmert, Kriminalroman, Lübbe, 2008, 
 Das alte Kind, Kriminalroman, Lübbe, 2010, 
 Der frühe Tod, Kriminalroman, Bastei Lübbe, 2011, 
 Edvard, Jugendroman, Baumhaus, 2012, 
 Das zerbrochene Fenster, Kriminalroman, Bastei Lübbe, August 2012, 
 Brixton Hill, Thriller, Heyne, Dezember 2013, 
 Schwarzblende, Thriller, Heyne, März 2015, 
 Die Lieferantin, Thriller, Suhrkamp, Juni 2017, 
 Paradise City, Thriller, Suhrkamp, Juni 2020,

Short Prose (Name: Zoë Beck) 

 Das Haus im Lieper Winkel (in: Endstation Ostsee, Hg. H.P. Karr; KBV), 2009, 
 Draußen. (in: München blutrot, Hg. A. Izquierdo, A. Esser), Kölnisch-Preußische Lektoratsanstalt, 2009, 
 Rapunzel (in: Die Märchenmörder, Hg. A. Izquierdo, A. Esser), Kölnisch-Preußische Lektoratsanstalt, 2010, 
 Ein zufriedener Mann (in: Berlin blutrot, Hg. A. Izquierdo, A. Esser), Kölnisch-Preußische Lektoratsanstalt, 2011, 
 Dorianna (in: Maria, Mord und Mandelplätzchen, Hg. Michelle Stöger), Knaur, 2011, 
 Welthauptstadt der Agoraphobiker (in: I hate Berlin, Hg. Moritz Kienast), Lübbe, 2011, 
 Weihnachtsdrücken (in: Lasst uns roh und garstig sein, Hg. Dietmar Bittrich), rororo, 2011, 
 Kerzenschein (in: Süßer die Morde nicht klingen, Hg. Cornelia Kuhnert, Richard Birkefeld), Heyne, 2012, 
 Stilles Wasser (in: Heide, Harz und Hackebeil, Hg. Cornelia Kuhnert, Richard Birkefeld), KBV, 2013, 
 Freundin. (in: Unter vier Augen – Sprachen des Porträts, Hg. Kirsten Voigt), Kerber, 2013, 
 Die Stimme (in: Eiskalte Weihnachtsengel, Hg. Cornelia Kuhnert), Heyne, 2013, 
 Berliner Leber (in: Mörderische Leckerbissen, Hg. Cornelia Kuhnert, Richard Birkefeld), dtv, 2013, 
 Rot wie Schnee (in: Den nächsten, der Frohe Weihnachten zu mir sagt, bringe ich um), Droemer, 2013, 
 Ein zufriedener Mann. Erzählungen, CulturBooks, July 2014, 
 Remember, remember, Knaur eBook, November 2014, 
 Pfau 117 (in: Irgendwo ins grüne Meer: Geschichten von Inseln, Hg. Anne von Canal, Isabel Bogdan), Arche, May 2016, 
 Fake It Or It Didn't Happen (Ausstellungskatalog Kunst Museum Winterthur für die Ausstellung von Karin Sander), Verlag Walther König, September 2018,

Non-fiction books 

 Depression. 100 Seiten, Reclam, May 2021,

Novels (Name: Henrike Heiland) 

 Späte Rache, Kriminalroman, Bastei Lübbe, 2006, 
 Zum Töten nah, Kriminalroman, Bastei Lübbe, 2007, 
 Blutsünde, Kriminalroman, Bastei Lübbe, 2007, 
 Von wegen Traummann!, Roman, Heyne, 2010, 
 Für immer und ledig?, Roman, Heyne, 2011,

Prose (Name: Henrike Heiland) 

 Der unglückliche Herr Dr. von und zu Wittenstein (in: Hell's Bells, Hg. Christiane Geldmacher), Poetenladen, 2008, 
 Leaving Lüdenscheid, oder: Opa muss weg (in: Mord am Hellweg IV, Hg. H. Knorr, H.P. Karr), Grafit, 2008, 
 Diese Sache in Rostock (in: Endstation Ostsee, Hg. H.P. Karr), KBV, 2009, 
 Konkurrenzausschluss (in: München blutrot, Hg. A. Izquierdo, A. Esser), Kölnisch-Preußische Lektoratsanstalt, 2009, 
 Bullets Over Bochum (in: Hängen im Schacht, Hg. H.P. Karr; KBV), 2009, 
 Hell-go-land (in: Morden zwischen den Meeren: Kleine Verbrechen aus Schleswig-Holstein, Hg. Jobst Schlennstedt), Pendragon, 2010, 
 Starnberger Strafvollzug (in: Tod am Starnberger See, Hg. Sabine Thomas), Gmeiner, 2010, 
 Exile on Genfbachstraße (in: Nordeifel Mordeifel, Hg. R. Kramp), KBV, 2010, 
 Die Dreizehn (in: Hamburg blutrot, Hg. A. Izquierdo, A. Esser), Kölnisch-Preußische Lektoratsanstalt, 2010, 
 Zum Kuckuck! (in: Die Mütter-Mafia und Friends: Das Imperium schlägt zurück, Hg. Kerstin Gier), Bastei Lübbe, 2011, 
 Gmundner Alibi (in: Tod am Tegernsee, Hg. Sabine Thomas), Gmeiner, 2011, 
 Onkel Horst vom Schillerplatz (in: Das Mordshaus an der Lahn, Hg. Klaus J. Frahm), KBV, 2011,

Translations 

 Caroline Tiger: Der Fernbeziehungs-Ratgeber: Wie man trotzdem glücklich wird. Ehrenwirth, Bergisch Gladbach 2008, .
 Steve Caplin und Simon Rose: Best of Papa: Geniale Ideen, die Vätern und Kindern Spaß machen. Bastei Lübbe, Bergisch Gladbach 2008, .
 Dia Reeves: Bleeding Violet. Baumhaus, Köln 2011, .
 Cat Clarke: vergissdeinnicht. Bastei Lübbe, Bergisch Gladbach 2012, .
 Dia Reeves: Blutsgeschwister. Baumhaus, Köln 2013, .
 Pippa Goldschmidt: Der südlichste Punkt. CulturBooks, Hamburg 2013, .
 Gary Dexter: Der Marodeur von Oxford. Diaphanes, Zürich/Berlin 2013, .
 Richard Surface: Das Vermächtnis. Acabus, Hamburg 2014, .
 Pippa Goldschmidt: Von der Notwendigkeit, den Weltraum zu ordnen. CulturBooks, Hamburg 2014, Digitalausgabe .
 Pippa Goldschmidt: Weiter als der Himmel. Weidle Verlag, Bonn 2015, .
 Sînziana Păltineanu: Elefantenchroniken. Fiktion, Berlin 2015, .
 James Grady: Die letzten Tage des Condor. Suhrkamp, Berlin 2016, .
 Amanda Lee Koe: Ministerium für öffentliche Erregung. CulturBooks, Hamburg 2016, .
 Karan Mahajan: In Gesellschaft kleiner Bomben. CulturBooks, Hamburg 2017, .
 Gerald Seymour: Vagabond. (mit Andrea O'Brien) Suhrkamp, Berlin 2017, .
 Pippa Goldschmidt: Von der Notwendigkeit, den Weltraum zu ordnen. CulturBooks, Hamburg 2018, erweiterte und überarbeitete Neuausgabe, Print. .
 Denise Mina: Blut, Salz, Wasser. Argument Ariadne, Hamburg 2018, .
 Helen Oyeyemi: Was du nicht hast, das brauchst du nicht. CulturBooks, Hamburg 2018, .
 Lesley Nneka Arimah: Was es bedeutet, wenn ein Mann aus dem Himmel fällt. Culturbooks, Hamburg 2019, .
 Sally Rooney: Gespräche mit Freunden. Luchterhand Literaturverlag, München 2019, .
 Denise Mina: Klare Sache. Argument Ariadne, Hamburg 2019. .
 Sally Rooney: Normale Menschen. Luchterhand Literaturverlag, München 2020, .
 Camilla Grudova: Das Alphabet der Puppen. Culturbooks, Hamburg 2020, .
 Ling Ma: New York Ghost. Culturbooks, Hamburg 2021, .
 Sally Rooney: Schöne Welt, wo bist du. Ullstein, Berlin 2021, .

References 

1975 births
Living people
People from Lahn-Dill-Kreis
21st-century German novelists
German translators
German publishers (people)
21st-century translators